The 2015 season was Johor Darul Takzim F.C. 3rd season in the Malaysia Super League after rebranding their name from Johor FC.

Squads

First team Squad

Pre-season And Friendlies

Malaysia Super League

League table

Result

Malaysia FA Cup

Results
Fixtures and Results of the 2015 Malaysia FA Cup.

First round

AFC Champions League

AFC Cup

Group stage

Knock-out stage

Round of 16

Quarter-finals

Semi-finals

Final

Malaysia Cup

Group stages

Results
Fixtures and Results of the 2015 Malaysia Cup.

Result

Knockout phase

Quarter-finals

Bracket

Goalscorers
Includes all competitive matches. The list is sorted by shirt number when total goals are equal.

Top Assists
Includes all competitive matches. The list is sorted by shirt number when total assists are equal.

Disciplinary record

Transfer

In

Out

Home Attendance

Matches (All Competitions)

Home Attendance (Each Competitions)

References

Johor Darul Ta'zim F.C.
Malaysian football clubs 2015 season